Uragannyy Point is an ice point along the west edge of Lazarev Ice Shelf about 3 nautical miles (6 km) north of Leningradskiy Island, Queen Maud Land. Mapped by the Soviet Antarctic Expedition in 1959. They named it Mys Uragannyy (hurricane point) because a strong hurricane occurred during the stay of the ship Ob' near this point.

Headlands of Queen Maud Land
Princess Astrid Coast